Ocean escort was a type of United States Navy warship. They were an evolution of the World War II destroyer escort types. The ocean escorts were intended as convoy escorts and were designed for mobilization production in wartime or low-cost mass production in peacetime. They were commissioned from 1954 through 1974, serving in the Cold War and the Vietnam War.

Designation
The ocean escorts' hull classification symbol was DE, a carryover from the World War II era when vessels of similar size and role were classified as destroyer escorts. DEs were ASW vessels; DEGs were ASW and AAW vessels with the short-range Tartar guided missile added. Ships similar or identical to the World War II destroyer escorts and the Cold War ocean escorts were called "frigates" in most other navies.

Outside the US Navy, no other navy appears to have used the ship type of "ocean escort". The closest equivalents in type name are the Soviet  and  classes, built circa 1954–65. These classes' Russian designation of storozhevoi korabi translates to "escort ship", "sentry ship", or "guard ship". Many USN ocean escorts were transferred to foreign navies following USN service; they received pennant numbers beginning with "D", "DE", "F", or (in the Mexican Navy) "E". The "E" designator was also used for ex-USN s in that navy.

Ocean escort classes
 (13) 
 (4) 
 (2) 
 (11) 
 (6)  (DEG)
 (46) 
 (82) total

1975 reclassification
The ocean escort type corresponded to other nations' frigates (convoy escorts). Until 1975, the US Navy used the term "frigate" for destroyer leaders (DL, DLG, DLGN).

The 1975 ship reclassification changed the ocean escorts (DE/DEG) to frigates (FF/FFG) to be in line with other nations' classifications. The DLG-type "frigates" became either destroyers or cruisers, depending on tonnage.

See also
 List of destroyer escorts of the United States Navy
 Frigate
 Destroyer escort
 Corvette - Cold War French Navy term for frigate-type ships
 Escort destroyer

References

Ship types